Capulin Peak is a summit in Rio Arriba County, New Mexico. Its former name in the Tewa language of the nearby Puebloan peoples was Abepin. Its Spanish name was Cerro Capulin, Capulin meaning Choke Cherry. The Armijo Route of the Old Spanish Trail ran westward at the foot of the peak at its south. This route is now closely followed or paralleled by New Mexico, New Mexico State Road 96.

References

Mountains of New Mexico
Landforms of Rio Arriba County, New Mexico
Old Spanish Trail (trade route)
Mountains of Rio Arriba County, New Mexico